Zamo is a department or commune of Sanguié Province in Burkina Faso.

Cities 
The town is composed of a chief town :

 Zamo

and 7 villages:

 Bekaporé
 Bounga
 Bow
 Guigui

 Koualio
 Lia
 Sadouan.

References 

Departments of Burkina Faso
Sanguié Province